Grace Young is an American cookbook author, activist, and food historian specializing in Chinese cuisine and wok cookery. She received the Julia Child Award from The Julia Child Foundation for Gastronomy and the Culinary Arts and James Beard Humanitarian of the Year award from the James Beard Foundation, both in 2022, for her culinary achievements.

Young has authored cookbooks focused on American Chinese cuisine with her books The Wisdom of the Chinese Kitchen and The Breath of a Wok being influential in highlighting the use of the Chinese wok to a new generation of cooks. Both books have won the Best International Cookbook Award from the International Association of Culinary Professionals.

Early life and career 
Young grew up in San Francisco, California. She credits Julia Child as one of her inspirations saying, "I wanted to do for Chinese cooking what Julia Child had done for French cooking."

After college, she worked for Time Life Books as their test kitchen director and director of food photography for more than 40 cookbooks.

Activism 
During the COVID-19 pandemic, Young advocated for the preservation of historic Chinatowns throughout the United States as well as bringing awareness to violence against Asian Americans. In 2020, when New York City Mayor Bill De Blasio was considering a city-wide lockdown, she worked with filmmaker Dan Ahn documenting the effect on Chinatown in New York City's Manhattan in a project called "Coronavirus: Chinatown Stories."

In 2021, she launched the Grace Young Support Chinatown Fund with the New York non-profit Welcome to Chinatown, raising $40,000. The funds went to established Chinatown restaurants Hop Lee, Hop Kee, Wo Hop Upstairs, and Wo Hop Downstairs to provide meals for those suffering from food insecurity. She said she is donating the $50,000 Julia Child Award prize to non-profit organizations that support Chinatowns across the United States.

Publications 
 The Wisdom of the Chinese Kitchen: Classic Family Recipes for Celebration and Healing, Simon and Schuster (1999)
 The Breath of a Wok, Simon Schuster (2004)
 Stir-Frying to the Sky's Edge: The Ultimate Guide to Mastery, with Authentic Recipes and Stories (2010)

References

External links 

 Yang Chow Fried Rice recipe from The Today Show
 Coronavirus: Chinatown Stories

Living people
American cookbook writers
American food writers
Women cookbook writers
James Beard Foundation Award winners
Asian American chefs
Year of birth missing (living people)